Kerkenes (or Kerkenes Dağı; both names are modern) is the largest pre-Hellenistic site from the Anatolian Plateau (Turkey) – 7 km (4 mi) of strong stone defenses, pierced by seven gates, that enclose 2.5 km2 (1.0 sq mi). It is located about 200 km (120 mi) east from Ankara (35.06E, 39.75N), between the towns of Yozgat (W) and Sorgun (E).

History
It has been suggested that this was a Hittite site in the Bronze Age, with the underlying hill being the sacred Mount Daha. An important Imperial Hittite city at Kusakli Hoyuk sits in the valley of Egrioz Su river about 8 km to the north-northwest of the city on the Kerkenes Dag. According to Gurney, the textual evidence that he assembled strongly points towards an identification of Kusakli Hoyuk with the town of Zippalanda, as mentioned in Hittite documents.
The huge overlaying Iron Age construction at the site makes this very difficult to verify.

The Iron Age city, apparently a planned urban space, was only briefly occupied and is extremely large.  This has suggested to some that the city was an imperial foundation of non-local peoples. Although its historical context remains unclear, Phrygian remains have been found. The archaeological survey shows that the city was burned, destroyed, and abandoned.

The site also contains a Byzantine castle.

Archaeology
The site was first examined in 1903 by J. G. C. Anderson.

In 1926 and 1927 H. H. von der Osten and F. H. Blackburn conducted a preliminary survey of the site and made a map of the city defences.

Also in 1926, the site was visited by Emil Forrer

In 1929 Erich Schmidt excavated at 
Kerkenes Dagh for around a week for the Oriental Institute of Chicago.

The international Kerkenes Project, which started in 1993 and ran until 2012, was directed by the British archaeologist Geoffrey Summers and Françoise Summers, both from Middle East Technical University (Ankara). 

Current fieldwork is ongoing directed by Scott Branting at the University of Central Florida.

Geoffrey Summers initially identified the site with the city of Pteria, which was described by Herodotus as belonging to the Medes. According to Herodotus, this city was captured by the Lydian king Croesus around the year 547 B.C. The Median identification has been rejected by various scholars, including Summers himself.

Nevertheless, Summers currently believes that the identification with Pteria remains correct. But rather than being a Median city, Pteria really was founded and belonged to the Phrygians. According to him, these Phrygians would have been natural allies of Media in its conflict with Lydia. For the Phrygians, Lydia was a long time opponent.

See also
Battle of Pteria
Alishar Hüyük
Cities of the ancient Near East
Gordium
Hattusa

Notes

References
K.Bittel, Legenden vom Kerkenes-Dag (Kappadokien), Orien, vol. 22-24, pp. 29–34, 1960
M. E. F. Summers, K. Ahmet and G. D. Summers, The Regional Survey at Kerkenes Dag: An Interim Report on the Seasons of 1993 and 1994, Anatolian Studies, vol. 45, pp. 43–68, 1995
Catherine Draycott et al., "Kerkenes Special Studies 1: Sculpture and Inscriptions from the Monumental Entrance to the Palatial Complex at Kerkenes Dag", Oriental Institute Publications, Volume 135, Chicago: The Oriental Institute of the University of Chicago, 2008

External links 
The Kerkenes Project Official Site
Kerkenes Project 1993-2012
Turkey Expedition, Kerkenes Archaeological Project
Archaeology in Turkey: The Stone, Bronze, and Iron Ages, 1997-1999, American Journal of Archaeology Vol. 105, No. 3
Kerkenes Special Studies 1: Sculpture and Inscriptions from the Monumental Entrance to the Palatial Complex at Kerkenes Dag, Turkey, Chicago: Oriental Institute Publications 135

Archaeological sites in Central Anatolia
Phrygia
Former populated places in Turkey
Geography of Yozgat Province
History of Yozgat Province